Ilija Prodanović (born October 16, 1979) is a Bosnian-Herzegovinian retired international footballer who played in Serbia and Montenegro, Bosnia and Herzegovina, Azerbaijan and Slovakia.

International career
He played once for Bosnia and Herzegovina, in a June 2009 friendly match against Uzbekistan.

Career Statistics

International

Statistics accurate as of match played 1 June 2009

References

External links
 

1979 births
Living people
People from Bečej
Association football central defenders
Bosnia and Herzegovina footballers
Bosnia and Herzegovina international footballers
FK Slavija Sarajevo players
HŠK Zrinjski Mostar players
FK Sloboda Tuzla players
NK Zvijezda Gradačac players
FK Mughan players
FC DAC 1904 Dunajská Streda players
First League of the Republika Srpska players
Premier League of Bosnia and Herzegovina players
Azerbaijan Premier League players
Slovak Super Liga players
Bosnia and Herzegovina expatriate footballers
Expatriate footballers in Serbia and Montenegro
Bosnia and Herzegovina expatriate sportspeople in Serbia and Montenegro
Expatriate footballers in Azerbaijan
Bosnia and Herzegovina expatriate sportspeople in Azerbaijan
Expatriate footballers in Slovakia
Bosnia and Herzegovina expatriate sportspeople in Slovakia